David Stuart (August 3, 1753 – October 1814) was a Virginia physician, politician, and correspondent of George Washington. When Washington became President of the United States, he made Stuart one of three commissioners appointed to design a new United States capital city.

Early life and education
David Stuart was the eldest of four sons borne by Sarah Foote, heiress of the "Cedar Grove" plantation on the Potomac River, and who in 1750 married Rev. William David Stuart (1723-1796), rector of St. Paul's Parish, King George County, Virginia. Rev. Stuart had studied theology in London and was ordained there by Bishop Edmonds. He became known for his eloquence and with his brother in law Horatio Dade served on the King George County Committee of Safety during the American Revolutionary War. His father (this man's grandfather), also named David Stuart, was descended from the royal house of Scotland and emigrated to Virginia in 1715, having become an ordained minister after unsuccessfully supporting the "pretender" James Francis Stuart, then married the daughter of the Governor of Barbados and after her death the daughter of Capt. Philip Alexander of King George County—all while serving as rector of the same parish (then in vast Stafford County, Virginia and now known as Aquia Church) until his death in 1749. Rev. Stuart's family also included six daughters, the eldest marrying Townsend Dade in 1769 and after his death, Richard Helm Foote of Fauquier County, all belonging to the First Families of Virginia.

This man, his grandson, received a private education suitable to his class, then graduated from the College of William and Mary in Williamsburg before sailing to Europe to complete his education. He studied medicine at the University of Edinburgh before finishing his medical and language studies in Paris, France. Absence abroad may account for him not serving in the Revolutionary War. His brother Richard in 1802 would marry the widow Margaret Robinson McCarty (whose husband held public office as well as operations plantations in Fairfax County) and his sister Ann in 1793 married William Mason, son of George Mason, whom Stuart in effect had replaced in the Virginia Ratification Convention described below.

Career and public life
Upon returning to Virginia, Stuart established a medical practice in Alexandria, Virginia, and mostly lived and farmed outside the city in Fairfax County, at first at Abington plantation (in an area which Virginia ceded to become the new federal city in 1790, which later became part of Arlington County and is now within Ronald Reagan National Airport). He and James Wright bought an Alexandria city lot in 1783, the year Stuart married Eleanor Calvert, widow of John Parke Custis, General George Washington's stepson who had died in 1781 leaving very young children as well as Abington. In 1792, Stuart and his family moved from Abingdon to Hope Park further west in Fairfax County. About ten years later, the family moved to Ossian Hall near Annandale, also in Fairfax County. The Virginia General Assembly also named Dr. Stuart as one of Fairfax County's gentleman justices, normally a lifetime appointment, and he had a crucial role in relocating the courthouse from Alexandria further inland in Fairfax County in December 1789.

Stuart also farmed in Fairfax County using enslaved labor. Several letters between the former President and Stuart (some of whose farming activities benefitted his stepchildren, as the residual beneficiaries of the dower slaves) discussed gradual abolition of slavery, as well as white landowners who harassed free Black landowners, knowing that Virginia's law against allowing Blacks to testify meant that illegal actions could have no negative consequences. In the 1787 tax census Stuart owned 13 adult slaves and nine enslaved children in Fairfax County, while his father owned 16 adult and 16 child slaves in King George County. His minister father retired in 1796 and may have died in 1799. In the 1810 census, Stuart may have owned property, including slaves, in both counties. His stepson G.W.P. Custis, who later criticized the former President's testamentary manumission of his slaves, helped the widower Stuart advertise the sale of slaves in Alexandria in 1812, and at his own death freed many slaves.

Fairfax County voters elected and thrice re-elected Stuart as one of their representatives to the Virginia House of Delegates, and he served in that part-time position from 1785 until 1789.

Prince William District voters chose Stuart as an elector for the 1788-1789 Presidential election. That District consisted of the Counties of Fairfax, Fauquier, Loudoun and Prince William, which cover the area south and west of present day Washington D.C. Each of the ten Virginia electors cast one of their two votes for George Washington; though Stuart's second vote is unknown five of those electors cast their other vote for John Adams, three cast theirs for George Clinton, one cast his for John Hancock and one cast his for John Jay.

Stuart ended his state legislative career by representing Fairfax County in the Virginia convention of 1788 that considered the ratification of the United States Constitution. Stuart served alongside Alexandria lawyer Charles Simms, also a staunch Federalist and multi-term Fairfax County representative in the House of Delegates; George Mason had often represented Fairfax County in the House of Delegates (and also served in the Philadelphia convention drafting the Constitution), but he vocally opposed ratification, so Fairfax county's voters refused to elect him to the Ratification Convention. Thus Mason instead represented Stafford County at the convention, where he and Patrick Henry led the anti-Ratification forces. Westmoreland County southeast of Fairfax County also elected federalist or ratification advocates: Henry Lee III (Light-Horse Harry Lee) and General Washington's nephew (and eventual heir), Bushrod Washington.

In the near final vote after extensive debate, the convention considered the following resolution: Resolved, That previous to the ratification of the new Constitution of government recommended by the late Federal Convention, a declaration of rights asserting and securing from encroachment the great principle of civil and religious liberty and the unalienable rights of the people, together with amendments to the most exceptional parts of the said Constitution, ought to be referred by this Convention to the other States in the American Confederation for their consideration.

Federalist or ratification forces led by James Madison, John Marshall and Edmund Randolph, defeated that Mason/Henry resolution, 88—80. Stuart, Simms, Lee, Washington, Madison, Marshall, Randolph and others then voted in favor of a resolution to ratify the constitution, which the convention approved on June 28, 1789 by a vote of 89-79, with Mason and Henry voting in the minority.

In 1791 President George Washington appointed Stuart to serve as a commissioner of the new Federal City to oversee the surveying of the new capital and construction of the public buildings. He served on the commission until 1794. In their first year, Stuart and the other commissioners named the capital the "City of Washington" in "The Territory of Columbia". On April 15, 1791, He and Daniel Carroll laid the first boundary stone for the new District at Jones Point.

Stuart also became administrator of the estate of John Parke Custis (in part because he married the widow) and in 1806 secured a judgment against the administrators of the estate of George Washington for 2,100 L Virginia currency.

Private life

In 1783 Stuart married Eleanor Calvert Custis, the widow of Washington's stepson John Parke Custis and a descendant of Cecilius Calvert, Lord Baltimore, who had received the charter for the Maryland colony. A number of letters from Washington to Stuart about family matters and Virginia politics have been preserved.

Stuart operated the property that Custis wanted his children to inherit when they came of age, and also helped raise John Parke Custis's and Eleanor's children. Daughters Elizabeth Parke Custis Law and Martha Parke Custis Peter lived with the Stuarts, while Eleanor Parke Custis and George Washington Parke Custis spent considerable time with George and Martha Washington, both at Mount Vernon and his governmental residence in Philadelphia. As mentioned above, the Stuarts and their growing family discussed below resided at three estates in Fairfax County: Abingdon, Hope Park and Ossian Hall. Dr. Stuart employed Dublin-born Thomas Tracy to tutor the children, and also allowed him to conduct classes for slave children in a different building. Dr. Stuart also was a founding trustee of the towns of Centreville and Providence (now Fairfax City), and of the Centreville Academy in 1808.

Eleanor and David had 16 children of their own before her death on September 28, 1811, including:

 Ann Calvert Stuart Robinson (born 1784), married William Robinson
 Sarah Stuart Waite (born 1786), married Obed Waite
 Ariana Calvert Stuart
 William Skolto Stuart
 Eleanor Custis Stuart (born 1792)
 Charles Calvert Stuart (1794–1846), married Cornelia Lee
 Rosalie Eugenia Stuart Webster (1796–1886), married William Greenleaf Webster

Death and legacy

Stuart's exact date and place of death is unknown, but his will was filed on Oct 17, 1814 and execution began shortly thereafter so it was no later than that. It's also unclear where he was buried, though his brother Richard Stuart appears to be buried in King George County, Virginia. A memorial marker to Stuart and his wife has existed since 2008 near the Calvert family vault in St. Thomas Church in Croom, Prince George's County, Maryland. Eleanor Calvert Custis Stuart had died at her daughter's house in Georgetown, District of Columbia and was originally buried at "Effingham" plantation in Prince William County.

References

1753 births
1814 deaths
Alumni of the University of Edinburgh
American planters
American slave owners
Delegates to the Virginia Ratifying Convention
18th-century American politicians
Custis family of Virginia
Members of the Virginia House of Delegates
Politicians from Alexandria, Virginia
People from Fairfax County, Virginia
Physicians from Virginia
Virginia colonial people
Trustees of populated places in Virginia